"Glad You Exist" is a song by American country pop duo Dan + Shay. It was released as the third single from their fourth studio album, Good Things on February 5, 2021. The members of the duo, Dan Smyers and Shay Mooney wrote the song along with Tayla Parx, Ryan Lewis, and Jordan Reynolds, the former of who produced it.

Background
On February 2, 2021, Dan + Shay explained the meaning of the song with a note through an Instagram post:to us, glad you exist is more than just a song.  it's a message of gratitude and hope.  a message to everyone in our lives: our fans, our friends, our families, to remind them all how grateful we are to be on the planet at the same time.  it's truly remarkable when you think about it.  we've spent the majority of the past year, like many others, searching for answers and a sense of normalcy, but finding comfort in memories of better days (that we all know will return soon).  concerts, bonfires, road trips with friends, even the simple things like date night at a restaurant, or beers at a bar during a football game.  this song has taken on new meaning not being able to see our loved ones in person, but throughout history, music has always had a special way of bringing people together, even when we are furthest apart.  these words hold a special place in our hearts, and hopefully they will in yours too.  we've said it before, and we'll say it again (and again).  we're just so glad you exist. every.  single.  one of you.

Speaking about the song, Dan Smyers told The Country Daily that he had the phrase "glad you exist" to be appreciative of his wife Abby Smyers and to be grateful that she is living in the same time that he is living. He brought it to Shay Mooney and the two were thinking of ideas, wanting to create a gratitude song about their friends, family, and fans.

Critical reception
Tomás Mier of People described the song as a "sweet, pop-country track" and that "the upbeat pop-infused track and its positive lyrics provide for the perfect optimistic soundtrack of 2021." CMTs Jessica Nicholson theorized that the duo was influenced by the loneliness of the COVID-19 pandemic to create the song and "it has also led many to find greater appreciation for the people they have in their lives.

Credits and personnel
Credits adapted from Tidal.

Dan + Shay
 Dan Smyers – bass guitar, drums, piano, synthesizer, background vocals, production, programming, recording, songwriting
 Shay Mooney – lead vocals, background vocals, songwriting
Other musicians and technical
 Abby Smyers – background vocals
 Bryan Sutton – acoustic guitar
 Jeff Juliano – mixing
 Andrew Mendelson – mastering
 Josh Ditty – additional engineering

Charts

Weekly charts

Year-end charts

Certifications

References

2021 singles
2021 songs
Dan + Shay songs
Songs written by Dan Smyers
Songs written by Shay Mooney
Songs written by Tayla Parx
Songs written by Ryan Lewis
Country ballads
Warner Records Nashville singles